Khaldeh (also Romanized as Khaldeh and Khaldeh; also known as Khālda and Khaldeh) is a village in Lamerd Rural District, Lamerd District, Mohr County, Fars Province, Iran. At the 2006 census, its population was 637, in 123 families.

References 

Populated places in Lamerd County